Lacmellea  is a genus of flowering plants in the family Apocynaceae first described as a genus in 1857. It is native to South America and Central America.

Species
 Lacmellea abbreviata J.F.Morales - Colombia
 Lacmellea aculeata (Ducke) Monach - Peru, NW Brazil, the Guianas
 Lacmellea arborescens (Müll.Arg.) Markgr. - Brazil, Bolivia
 Lacmellea bahiensis J.F.Morales - Bahia
 Lacmellea costanensis Steyerm. - N Venezuela
 Lacmellea densifoliata (Ducke) Markgr. - Pará
 Lacmellea edulis H.Karst. - Panama, Venezuela, Colombia, Ecuador, Peru, Brazil
 Lacmellea floribunda (Poepp.) Benth. & Hook.f. - Peru, NW Brazil, Suriname, French Guiana
 Lacmellea foxii (Stapf) Markgr. - Peru
 Lacmellea gracilis (Müll.Arg.) Markgr. - N Peru, NW Brazil
 Lacmellea guyanensis (Müll.Arg.) Monach - French Guiana
 Lacmellea klugii Monach. - Peru
 Lacmellea macrantha J.F.Morales - Ecuador
 Lacmellea microcarpa (Müll.Arg.) Markgr. - Colombia, S Venezuela, NW Brazil
 Lacmellea oblongata Markgr. - SE Colombia, Ecuador, Peru
 Lacmellea panamensis (Woodson) Markgr. - Costa Rica, Panama, Colombia, Ecuador
 Lacmellea pauciflora (Kuhlm.) Markgr. - Brazil
 Lacmellea peruviana (Van Heurck & Müll.Arg.) Markgr. - Peru
 Lacmellea pygmaea Monach. - Amazonas State in Venezuela
 Lacmellea ramosissima (Müll.Arg.) Markgr. - Colombia, S Venezuela, NW Brazil
 Lacmellea speciosa Woodson - Costa Rica, Panama, Colombia, Ecuador, Peru
 Lacmellea standleyi (Woodson) Monach. - Belize, Guatemala, Honduras
 Lacmellea utilis (Arn.) Markgr. - S Venezuela, Guyana
 Lacmellea zamorae J.F.Morales - Costa Rica

References

Apocynaceae genera
Rauvolfioideae
Taxa named by Gustav Karl Wilhelm Hermann Karsten